The 1950–51 Southern Football League season was the 48th in the history of the league, an English football competition.

At the end of the previous season Colchester United and Gillingham were elected to the Football League. The league consisted of 24 clubs, including 22 clubs from the previous season, and two newly elected clubs - Kettering Town and Llanelly. Merthyr Tydfil were champions for the second season in a row, winning their third Southern League title. Six Southern League clubs applied to join the Football League at the end of the season, but none were successful.

League table

Football League elections
Six Southern League clubs applied for election to the Football League. However, none were successful as only Workington of the North Eastern League received more votes than a League club (New Brighton).

References

Southern Football League seasons
S